Weyhe Gallery, established in 1919 in New York City, is an art gallery specializing in prints. It is now in Mount Desert, Maine.

History
Erhard Weyhe (1883–1972) established the Weyhe Gallery in 1919. He also operated a bookstore, the Weyhe bookstore, at the same location at 794 Lexington Avenue. Weyhe had immigrated to the United States from England just before the start of World War I. By 1923, he had bought the brownstone building on Lexington Avenue that would house the Gallery until 1994.

The Weyhe Gallery published prints singly or in portfolios. It emphasized emerging artists, and it was a prominent institution in the American art world in the first half of the 20th century. Modernist artists were among its early popular exhibitors:

In 1991, David Kiehl, associate curator of prints and photographs at the Metropolitan Museum of Art, called the building "a shrine for modern art," describing "early exhibits of the German Expressionists, of Matisse, of Picasso, of Mexican and African art".

Weyhe also published an art magazine, The Checkerboard.

The gallery's first director was Carl Zigrosser, who continued in this role until 1940. Erhard Weyhe's daughter, Gertrude Dennis, operated the gallery and book store after his death in 1972 until her death in 2003. At that time, the New York City establishment closed its doors, and it was relocated to Mount Desert, Maine. Deborah Kiley, Weyhe's granddaughter, is the current owner of the Weyhe Gallery and the book store, Weyhe Art Books.

The current incarnation of the Weyhe Gallery maintains collections in the following areas: 19th century European, American Pre-1950, Classic Modernism, and American Regionalism. Among the many artists represented in its collections are John James Audubon, George Grosz, Henri Matisse, Pablo Picasso, Käthe Kollwitz, Max Weber, Raoul Dufy, Diego Rivera, Levon West, Lovis Corinth and Angelo Pinto.

The files of the Weyhe Gallery from 1919 to 1994 are part of the research collections of the Smithsonian's Archives of American Art.

See also

 Modernism
 Printmaking

References

Defunct art museums and galleries in Manhattan
Art museums and galleries in Maine
Modern art museums in the United States
American art dealers
Buildings and structures in Mount Desert, Maine